James Merrill Brickman (born November 20, 1961) is an American pop songwriter, pianist and radio host. Brickman has earned two Grammy nominations for his albums Peace (2003) for Best Instrumental, and Faith (2009) for Best New Age Album. He won a Canadian Country Music Award, a Dove Award presented by the Gospel Music Association, and was twice named Songwriter of the Year by SESAC. Billboard lists 22 of his albums reaching No. 1 on the New Age chart, and 16 of his songs reaching Top 10 on the Adult Contemporary chart.  Four of his albums were certified Gold by the Recording Industry Association of America (RIAA).

Since 1997, he has hosted his own radio show, The Jim Brickman Show, which is carried on radio stations throughout the United States.

Brickman has collaborated with Lady A, Johnny Mathis, Kenny Rogers, Michael W. Smith, Leslie Odom Jr., Martina McBride, Megan Hilty, Donny Osmond, Delta Goodrem, Olivia Newton-John, Carly Simon, John Oates, Five for Fighting, Michael Bolton, Gerald Levert, Jane Krakowski, Richie McDonald, Mat & Savanna Shaw, and many others.

Early life
Brickman was born and raised in Shaker Heights, Ohio, and began playing piano at the age of five. His Jewish parents took him to services at Suburban Temple-Kol Ami in nearby Beachwood, where Brickman was confirmed in his teens. He attended Shaker Heights High School, and he performed on piano with the high school orchestra. He heard fellow student Anne Cochran sing in a musical, and introduced himself, asking her to join him in performing piano-vocal material. Together, they won a talent competition hosted by the WGCL "G98" radio station. Another high school friend named Meg Tippett convinced Brickman to join the Heights Youth Theatre as accompanist, which grew into four years as musical director.

Brickman studied composition and performance at the Cleveland Institute of Music while taking business classes at Case Western Reserve University. In 1980, Brickman founded his own advertising music company called The Brickman Arrangement, writing commercial jingles for many companies across the country such as McDonald's, Pontiac, City of Cleveland, Ohio Lottery, and Isuzu.

Musical career
Brickman signed to Windham Hill Records in 1994 and released his first album, No Words featuring the song "Rocket to the Moon" which became his first solo instrumental to be ranked on the Billboard charts. The songs "Angel Eyes" and "If You Believe" gained radio airplay from Brickman's second release, By Heart on the Windham Hill label in 1995. The following year, the CD's title track, "By Heart", became his first top 20 adult contemporary (AC) hit. In 1997, Brickman released the album Picture This, adding a vocal performance, "Valentine", sung by Martina McBride. By the end of the year, Brickman issued the first of many Christmas CDs, The Gift, with the title song featuring Collin Raye and Susan Ashton, topping three different charts; for this album, Brickman received a Dove Award from the Gospel Music Association. He later produced several other Christmas-themed albums, Peace (2003), Christmas Romance (2006), Homecoming (2007), and The Hymns and Carols of Christmas (2008); and his two albums Grace (2005) and Faith (2008) concentrated on arrangements of well-known Christian music.

During his career, four albums have sold over 500,000 copies; By Heart (1995), Picture This (1997), The Gift (1997), and Destiny (1999), qualifying them as Gold records in the United States. In November 2005, three of Brickman's albums, The Disney Songbook (2005), Grace (2005) and Greatest Hits (2004), held the top three spots on Billboard's New Age chart. He also received a Grammy nomination in 2003, an SESAC "Songwriter of the Year" award, and a Canadian Country Music Award for "Best Vocal/Instrumental Collaboration". The 2008 album Faith was nominated for the 2009 Grammy Award for Best New Age Album.

Brickman composes a variety of music, and is known for his success in radio's adult contemporary format. He has collaborated with artists from all genres with songs like "Love of My Life" with Michael W. Smith, "You" with Jane Krakowski, "Never Alone" with country group Lady A, "After All These Years" with Anne Cochran, and "Never Far Away" with Christian contemporary group Rush of Fools, among others. Because of his long association with Windham Hill, his work is sometimes classified in the new-age genre, although Brickman considers his style to be broader than that. In May 2006, Brickman left Windham Hill and signed with Savoy Label Group (SLG) to release music under his own Brickman Music Group imprint. The album Escape was his first release distributed by SLG, following Pure Jim Brickman, a career-spanning compilation from Windham Hill.

In 2015, Brickman released the first album in the Soothe series for relaxation, meditation, yoga and massage. Soothe, Vol. 1 came with an audiobook. Three more volumes in the series followed through 2019.

Radio show
Making its debut in January 1997, Your Weekend with Jim Brickman is a four-hour radio show that has been heard across the US featuring music blended with celebrity interviews, lifestyle features and entertainment reports.

In 2018, The Jim Brickman Show Podcast debuted on Pandora. Two years later, his podcast moved to Spotify as The Brickman Bedtime Story.

Television
Brickman filmed the PBS specials My Romance: An Evening with Jim Brickman (2000), Love Songs & Lullabies (2002), The Disney Songbook (2005), and Beautiful World (2009). He has appeared on various TV shows such as Good Morning America and Live with Regis and Kathie Lee.

Personal life
Brickman grew up in Cleveland. He currently has a residence there as well as in New York City.

Other media
Brickman appeared on the September–October 2013 cover of Making Music Magazine to discuss his life and career.

Brickhouse Direct
Brickman founded Brickhouse Direct (BHD) in 2003 to provide internet marketing and e-commerce solutions. They specialized in promoting new acts and reinvigorating the careers of veteran musicians. In 2005, Brickhouse bought the online marketing firm Viawerk, bringing Viawerk co-founder Rod Flauhaus on board as partner. Flauhaus co-wrote the album Homecoming. Brickman's younger brother Michael served as president of Brickhouse. The label also published works by saxophonist Dave Koz, comedian Anita Renfroe, singer Chris Sligh and singer Mark Masri. Brickman's own 2012 album Blessings was released on the Brickhouse Direct label.

Discography

Albums

Singles 

A "Valentine" was originally only released to Adult Contemporary and charted on Hot Country Songs as an album cut. It was remixed and released to country radio the following year. It also peaked at No. 50 on the Billboard Hot 100.
B "Sending You a Little Christmas" also peaked at No. 15 on Hot Christian Songs.
C "Escape" peaked at No. 17 on Hot Contemporary Jazz Songs.
D Peak position from Christmas version titled "Merry Christmas Beautiful".

Music videos

Awards
1998 – Canadian Country Music Association Award, Vocal Collaboration of the Year, for "Your Love" with Michelle Wright
1998 – Dove Award presented by the Gospel Music Association for "The Gift" with Collin Raye and Susan Ashton
1998 – SESAC Songwriter of the Year
1999 – SESAC Songwriter of the Year
2002 – SESAC: Performance award, for Simple Things
2003 – SESAC: New Adult Contemporary album, for Love Songs and Lullabies
2003 – Grammy nomination for Best Pop Instrumental Album, for Peace
2009 – Grammy nomination for Best New Age Album, for Faith

References

External links 

 

1961 births
Living people
Songwriters from Ohio
American pop pianists
Composers for piano
Cleveland Institute of Music alumni
Jewish American musicians
Jewish American songwriters
Light music composers
New-age pianists
Ballad musicians
Musicians from Cleveland
Musicians from Shaker Heights, Ohio
American country pianists
American male pianists
Windham Hill Records artists
American radio personalities
20th-century American pianists
Case Western Reserve University alumni
Country musicians from Ohio
21st-century American pianists
20th-century American male musicians
21st-century American male musicians
American male songwriters